Elite is a Spanish teen drama series created for Netflix by Carlos Montero and Darío Madrona. The series is set in Las Encinas, a fictional elite high school and revolves around the relationships between three working-class students enrolled at the school through a scholarship program and their wealthy classmates. The series features an ensemble cast. Many of the cast previously featured in other Netflix works produced or distributed in Spain and Latin America.

Elite explores concepts and themes associated with dramas, but also features more progressive issues and other sides to its clichés. These include many diverse sexual themes. Structurally, the series employs a flash-forward plot that involves a mystery element, with each season taking place in two timelines.

The first season, consisting of eight episodes, was released on Netflix on 5 October 2018. It received positive reviews from critics with many hailing the series as a "guilty pleasure", and praising its writing, acting and portrayal of mature themes. In October 2018, the series was renewed for a second season, which was released on 6 September 2019. A third season was ordered in August 2019 and was released on 13 March 2020. In May 2020 and February 2021, Netflix renewed the series for a fourth and fifth season. The fourth season was released on 18 June 2021, with the fifth season released on 8 April 2022. In October 2021, Netflix renewed the series for a sixth season, which was released on 18 November 2022. On 25 October, Netflix confirmed the show has been renewed for a seventh season, with original star Omar Ayuso returning.

Plot

Season 1
After their school building collapses, three working-class friends – Samuel, Nadia and Christian – are offered scholarships to Las Encinas, the most exclusive private school in Madrid, Spain to finish their Junior year. The scholarships are sponsored by the construction company at fault for the school's collapse. At Las Encinas, the three are initially ostracized by wealthy students. But as the school year progresses, their lives intertwine in a clash of lifestyles, resentments, envy, and sexual attraction. 

Main event of Season 1: Marina’s murder

Season 2
After the revelation of the murder, the second season deals with the lead-up to the disappearance of Samuel. The seasons starts with the students returning to school for the first time since Marina's death to start their Senior year, and are accompanied by three new students: Rebekah, Cayetana and Valerio, who all have dark secrets of their own. They befriend the students in their class whilst Samuel continues with his plan to clear the name of his brother Nano, who was accused of Marina's murder. Meanwhile, Polo attempts suicide to clear his conscience but eventually learns to live happily with the help of Cayetana. Ander's mental health deteriorates due to the burden of keeping Polo's secret. Carla is made to believe that Samuel is dead so she confesses about Polo's crime, Polo is arrested, but is released two weeks later and returns to school.

Main event of Season 2: Samuel’s disappearance

Season 3
The students enter their last semester at Las Encinas. In a flash-forward plot, the students are interviewed about Polo's death during their graduation party. Polo and Cayetana are left as outcasts by their peers, with the exception of Valerio. Samuel and Guzman continue their plot to bring justice for Polo's crimes. Lu and Nadia compete for a scholarship to Columbia University, leading the two to form a mutual friendship. Ander is diagnosed with leukaemia and begins chemotherapy, causing friction between him and his loved ones. On the night of their graduation, in a drunken stupor, Lu accidentally stabs Polo, who stumbles and falls to his death. Samuel, Guzmán, Ander, Omar, Nadia, Carla, Valerio, Rebeka and Cayetana agree to cover up the murder. Unable to find a suspect, Polo's death is eventually ruled as a suicide and his parents tell the police he confessed to Marina's murder. Two months later, Samuel, Guzman, Ander and Rebeka return to repeat their final year with Omar, who has enrolled as a full-time student, and Cayetana becomes the new cleaning lady of Las Encinas.

Main event of Season 3: Polo’s murder

Season 4
With the beginning of a new year and the arrival of a new principal, Benjamin, and his kids – Ari, Mencía and Patrick – comes a new mystery after Ari is found close to death, with every plot leading, through some flash-forward, how this happened. Benjamin’s children join the same class of Samuel, Guzmán, Rebeka, Ander and Omar, along with Phillipe, a French prince, who joins Las Encinas after a scandal. The four new students start to form bonds with the veteran ones. Meanwhile Mencía starts to join prostitution, led by Armando, a business man close to Benjamin. Ari’s attempted murder and Armando’s death later are discovered to be interlinked.

Main event of Season 4: Ari’s attempted murder

Season 5
In the aftermath of Armando's death at the hands of Guzmán, he and Ander dropped out of school to travel around the world. Samuel and Rebeka are keeping the truth about what happened from everyone, including Omar, Cayetana, Ari, Mencía and Patrick. That is, until his body is discovered and it sets off a chain events changes that rips their relationships apart and changes their lives forever. Also, two new students – Isadora and Iván – begin attending Las Encinas and soon form bonds with the current upperclassmen, mainly Phillipe and Patrick, but some of these relationships prove to be more deadly than others. In a flash-forward, Samuel's body is discovered floating in a pool, with every plot leading to how he got there and finding out what actually happened.

Main event of Season 5: Samuel’s murder

Season 6
Three months after the death of Samuel and Benjamin's arrest for his murder, a new year of school begins. Omar, Rebeka and Phillipe have graduated and moved out of Madrid. Meanwhile Ari, Patrick and Mencía are forced to repeat their final year after dropping out the previous spring due to their father’s arrest. Meanwhile, Iván and Isadora are entering their final year. They are greeted by some new students: Nico, Rocío, Dídac and Sara, along with Sara’s abusive boyfriend, Raúl. Many situations occurred during the season, and the flash-forward event that characterizes this season is Iván’s accident after being hit by a car, and his subsequent coma. Cruz comes out as homosexual but murdered following that.

Main event of Season 6: Iván’s accident and subsequent coma

Cast and characters

Introduced in season 1 
 María Pedraza as Marina Nunier Osuna (season 1), Guzmán's sister and love interest of Nano and Samuel. She comes from a wealthy family and has a streak of falling for the 'bad boy'. She rebels against the hypocritical ways of her family, while maintaining a youthful and joyful spirit. She is murdered in season 1.
 Itzan Escamilla as Samuel García Domínguez (seasons 1–5), one of three transfer students, who is the love interest of Marina and later falls for Carla.  A hardworking, shy and tricky guy. He always looks out for the people around him. He is justice-driven and will go to extreme lengths to ensure that everyone gets what they deserve. Right before the graduation at the end of season 3, he is expelled from school with Guzmán for bullying Polo, so he has to repeat the last year. He is accidentally seriously injured by Benjamin at the end of season 5, with his death announced at the beginning of season 6.
 Miguel Bernardeau as Guzmán Nunier Osuna (seasons 1–4), adopted brother of Marina, and Lu's ex-boyfriend, who falls for Nadia. A hot-headed popular guy at school. He believes his way is always the right way. He is extremely protective of his sister, and does not bond well with the transfer students. He would do anything for his friends. After Marina’s death he becomes very close to Samuel, with whom he is expelled by school at the end of season 3 for  bullying Polo, so he has to repeat the last year of school. At the end of season 4 he and Ander decide to leave the school for travelling around the world.
 Miguel Herrán as Christian Varela Expósito (seasons 1–2), one of three transfer students, who gets into a relationship with Polo and Carla. A comical and carefree transfer student who tries to stay connected with his past, while trying to assimilate with the richer students. In season 2, he is deliberately run over by Carla's father, leaving him seriously injured, and has him transferred to another hospital in Switzerland to prevent the truth about Marina's murder from being revealed.
 Jaime Lorente as Fernando "Nano" García Domínguez (seasons 1–2), Samuel's older brother who just got out of prison, who is also a love interest of Marina. His handsome and dangerous aura draws Marina in. He struggles to pay a debt from prison and will do anything to get his hands on money. He is caring and sensitive to the people close to him. He often finds himself in trouble.
 Álvaro Rico as Leopoldo "Polo" Benavent Villada (seasons 1–3), Carla's ex-boyfriend and Cayetana's love interest. He is submissive in nature and will follow the orders of the people he is close to. He is extremely wealthy, the son of two mothers, and suffers from anxiety attacks. He murdered Marina at the end of season 1. He is bisexual, and for this reason he has a triangle relationship with both Cayetana and Valerio in season 3. At the end of season 3, he dies after being stabbed with a bottleneck by Lu and falling through a glass balcony.
 Arón Piper as Ander Muñoz (seasons 1–4), son of the principal who falls for Omar. He is a star athlete and under constant pressure from his parents to excel in everything he does. This pushes him to take drugs. He is driven to get what he wants while caring deeply for the people that matters most to him. He is gay. In season 3 he discovers he has a rare form of leukaemia, and for this reason he walks away from both his friends and Omar, but he manages to overcome the disease, but he has to repeat the last year of school. In season 4 he and Omar have a triangle relationship with Patrick. At the end of season 4 he and Guzmán decide to leave the school for travelling around the world.
 Mina El Hammani as Nadia Shanaa (seasons 1–4), one of three transfer students, the daughter of Palestinian immigrants and the love interest of Guzmán. She is academically driven and holds her religious and personal values close to her. She was eventually banned from wearing the hijab at school, and the more she assimilates with the school culture, the more she gains her independence from her overprotective parents. After the graduation she goes at the university in New York, along with Lu, who becomes her best friend.
 Ester Expósito as Carla Rosón Caleruega (seasons 1–3), Polo's ex-girlfriend and Christian's sex partner who later falls in love with Samuel. She is beautiful, cold and manipulative. She is the daughter of a marchioness and is extremely wealthy. She uses her sexuality to get what she wants. A softer side of her is shown as she cares about the people she loves and will go to extreme lengths to cover up their faults and supports them. After the graduation, she moves to London due to the university.
 Omar Ayuso as Omar Shanaa (seasons 1–5, guest season 7) Nadia's brother, who falls for Ander against his father's wishes. He is a closeted gay guy who struggles with pleasing his parents while living his true self. He dealt drugs to make enough money to move out. He is shy, detail-oriented and best friends with Samuel. In season 3, he resumes his school studies and enrolls at Las Encinas. In season 4 he and Ander have a triangle relationship with Patrick. He leaves the school and the city after Samuel’s death, but in season 7 he returns.
 Danna Paola as Lucrecia "Lu" Montesinos Hendrich (seasons 1–3), Guzmán's ex-girlfriend who shares an incestuous relationship with her half-brother, Valerio. She is strong-witted, competitive and manipulative. She will go to extreme lengths to secure what she believes will bring her happiness; however, she is aware that she will never be satisfied no matter how much she has. She had a strong dislike for Nadia, but they eventually become friends. She is also extremely wealthy. After the graduation, she moves to New York due to the university, along with Nadia, who becomes her best friend.

Introduced in season 2 
 Jorge López as Valerio Montesinos Rojas (seasons 2–3), Lu's Chilean half-brother. He is a drug addict, likes to party, and will do anything for Lu, with whom he shares an incestuous relationship. He eventually befriends Nadia. At the end of season 3 he is expelled for being involved in Rebeka's drug selling at the school but instead of repeating the year he is left in charge by Carla to take over her father's wineries while she studies abroad in London. 
 Claudia Salas as Rebeka Parrilla López (seasons 2–5), a rebellious, wealthy girl who has a crush on Samuel. She is different from the other wealthier students in her class as she likes to flaunt her wealth through her clothes and jewellery extravagantly. She was not born into wealth which causes her to sympathise a lot with Nadia, Omar and Samuel. Her mother engages in the drug business. From season 4 she has a turbulent relationship with Mencía. She leaves the school and the city after Samuel’s death.
 Georgina Amorós as Cayetana Grajera Pando (seasons 2–5), the daughter of a cleaning lady who lives a fraudulent lifestyle and is the love interest of Polo. She is manipulative to the extent of fabricating a whole lifestyle to assimilate with the wealthier students in her class. She befriends Lu and will go to extreme lengths to prove how wealthy she is. Her mother, a cleaning lady, works at the school where she disapproves of her daughter's lies. After the death of Polo, she accepts her non-wealthy life and becomes the new school cleaner. She also has a relationship with Phillipe before falling for Felipe at the end of season 5.

Introduced in season 3 
 Leïti Sène as Malick Diallo (season 3), a love interest of Omar. He is flirtatious and manipulative, using Nadia as a beard to get closer to Omar. He is wealthy and puts on a performance to appear to be a 'good' Muslim.
 Sergio Momo as Yeray Engonga (season 3), a love interest of Carla. A young wealthy student who started up his own business. He was initially overweight and was bullied for it constantly, but Carla gave him the confidence to change his habits. He is superficial as he sees Carla as an ornament he can parade around, but ultimately he shows a more caring side.

Introduced in season 4 
 Carla Díaz as Ariadna "Ari" Blanco Commerford (seasons 4–6), Patrick's twin sister and Mencía's older sister, caught in a relationship between Samuel and Guzmán. She is seriously injured in season 4, with her attempted homicide being central to the season. In season 5, she continues her relationship with Samuel, while having an affair with Iván. She has an affair with Nico in season 6. When her father is released from jail, she and her family move elsewhere at the end of season 6 to start a new life. 
 Martina Cariddi as Mencía Blanco Commerford (seasons 4–6), Ari and Patrick's younger sister, she forms a relationship with Rebeka while also working as a prostitute. In season 6 she becomes close to Sara and Raúl, a strange toxic couple, trying to help Sara to go away from him. When her father is released from jail, she and her family move elsewhere at the end of season 6 to start a new life.
 Manu Ríos as Patrick Blanco Commerford (seasons 4–6), Ari's twin brother and Mencía's older brother, who becomes in season 4 the lover of both Omar and Ander. In season 5, he has a sexual affair with Iván’s father, Cruz, for then falling in love with Iván at the end of the season. In season 6 he and Iván have a turbulent relationship even if they love each other, and Patrick decides to go away from him for a while before he wakes up from a coma, to then coming back together happily. When his father is released from jail, he and his family move elsewhere to start a new life.
 Diego Martín as Benjamín Blanco (seasons 4–6), the new school principal and Patrick, Ari and Mencía's father. At the end of season 5 he goes to jail after he accidentally murdered Samuel, but is then released at the end of season 6, and he and his son and his daughters move elsewhere to start a new life.
 Pol Granch as Phillipe Florian von Triesenberg (seasons 4–5), a prince who forms a relationship with Cayetana. The direct heir to the throne of a Central European principality. In season 5, he has a fake relationship with Isadora, but she helps her to report the people who raped her. He then goes back to the principality after the end of the school.
 Andrés Velencoso as Armando de la Ossa (seasons 4–5), an older man who pays Mencía for sex. At the end of season 4 he tries to kill Ari and for this reason he is murdered by Guzmán, with his body thrown into a lake by Guzmán, Rebeka and Samuel. His body is found during season 5.

Introduced in season 5 
 Valentina Zenere as Isadora Artiñán (seasons 5–7), the wealthy "it girl" empress of Ibiza and a DJ who develops a fake relationship with Phillipe, with her falling in love but those feelings not reciprocated by him. She is raped by Hugo, Álex and Javier in season 5 and she begins to suffer from panic anxiety. She then develops a friendship and eventually romantic feelings for Dídac in season 6.
 André Lamoglia as Iván Carvalho (seasons 5–7), son of Cruz, a famous football player, and he is attracted to Ari while falling for Patrick at the end of season 5. In season 6 he gets hit by a car driven by Sara and falls into a coma. He and Patrick have a turbulent relationship even if they love each other, and Patrick decides to go away from him for a while to then eventually coming back together, right before he wakes up miraculously from the coma.
 Carloto Cotta as Cruz Carvalho (seasons 5–6), Iván's father, who is hiding the truth about his sexuality and his relationship with Patrick. He is brutally murdered in season 6 by homophobes after publicly coming out.
 Adam Nourou as Bilal Ibrahim (seasons 5–6), a homeless young man from the Comoros who leans on Omar for support. In season 6 he works as a waiter at Isadora’s hotel, while developing a relationship with Rocío.

Introduced in season 6 
 Carmen Arrufat as Sara (seasons 6–7), an influencer who is in a toxic relationship with Raúl, who continually abuses her. Mencía tries to help her to get away from him. She accidentally hits Iván with a car, keeping the secret with Raúl and instead trying to blame Mencía, who was on drugs in the car during the crash.
 Álex Pastrana as Raúl (seasons 6–7), Sara’s abusive boyfriend, who manipulates her and who wants to get her away from Mencía. Raúl is obssesive and controlling. He is always checking on his girlfriend to see where she is and resorts to physical violence.
 Álvaro de Juana as Dídac (seasons 6–7), a wary guy who initially befriends the guys who rape Isadora. He belongs to a wealthy family of hoteliers, who are against Isadora’s family. He starts to believe Isadora and then he helps her to get his friends arrested. They fall in love at the end of season 6.
 Ander Puig as Nicolás "Nico" Fernández de Velasco Viveros (seasons 6–7), a transgender guy who has a relationship with Sonia, while falling for Ari. He returns to school after having gender affirmation surgery and has his name legally changed. Ari has a difficult time accepting Nico's gender identity, causing Nico to become insecure.
 Ana Bokesa  as Rocío (seasons 6–7), a wealthy girl of Guinean descent who forms a relationship with Bilal. Rocío wants to connect with her African heritage and culture. She takes an interest in Bilal and flirts with him, but at first the feelings are not reciprocated. Unlike Rocío, Bilal is not as interested in connecting with his African heritage until he finds out about her social condition.
 Nadia Al Saidi  as Sonia (seasons 6–7), Nico’s girlfriend who then becomes very close to Ari and support her to get an abortion.

Introduced in season 7 
 Anitta (season 7)
 Mirela Balic as Chloe (seasons 7–present)
 Gleb Abrosimov (seasons 7–present)
 Fernando Líndez (seasons 7–present
 Iván Mendes (seasons 7–present)
 Alejandro Albarracín (seasons 7–present)
 Maribel Verdú (seasons 7–present)

Production

Development and themes

On 17 July 2017, it was announced that Netflix had given the production a series order for a first season; it is the second Netflix original series in Spain after Cable Girls. The series is created by Carlos Montero and Darío Madrona, who are both credited as executive producers of the series; as Netflix announced the order, The Hollywood Reporter wrote that the series' team "boasts one of the most successful writing teams in Spain's current TV landscape". Montero and Madrona developed the series after being told that Netflix was looking for a teenage show and were asked to produce an idea. Montero came up with the basic premise and the pair worked on it before presenting it to Netflix a month later.

At the time, Erik Barmack, Netflix's VP of original series, said that Elite would be "a very different kind of teen thriller that will cross borders and affect audiences globally". Still, the creators said that the series has a lot of Spanish themes and Spanish identity, to give it "a sense of place and time, that it is a series of this moment and of this country", and to prevent it from becoming a "series that could happen anywhere in the world [because if they try to make something] that can be understood everywhere, in the end, it is not understood anywhere". In September 2018, it was announced that the series would premiere on 5 October 2018. Producer Francisco Ramos spoke about some of the decisions in creating the show in an interview before it was released. He said that the choice to set the mystery drama in a high school was important because "it is the time of your life when things matter the most", allowing them to explore the pressures of fitting in as an elite alongside the other plot lines.

On 17 October 2018, Netflix renewed the series for a second season. During this period, it was increasing production in Spain after having constructed new production facilities in Madrid. As Netflix renewed the show, it announced that there were still discussions on which characters would appear. The second season was released on 6 September 2019; it began production after the viewership for the first season was known, in January 2019, though it had been written before season 1 had been released.

The internal structure of the show uses flash-forwards to advance the plot and the mystery, which Variety compared to that of Big Little Lies. When speaking of the innovation in the second season, co-creator Darío Madrona said that they "wanted to keep the fast-forward formula as a staple of the series, but at the same time be different". Madrona said: "In the first season, we were conscious that we were making a series for Netflix, and tried to put everything into it [...] For season 2, we thought that we had the opportunity to explore the characters and the new ones as well. But it was an instinctive decision." Variety wrote that the second season, therefore, may be similar to Stranger Things season 3 in the way it compares to its more plot-driven predecessor seasons and how it "drives deeper into [the characters'] interaction, in continued coming of age narratives which are deeply inflected by class and economics". The production values and costs were also raised for season 2 to allow the creators more freedom.

The character Cayetana (Georgina Amorós), introduced in season 2, is said to tackle the topic of appearances being everything–a theme of the series–from a different angle. She is a social media influencer and, according to Amorós, "isn't at all what she seems". Social media is another theme examined in season 2, with Darío Madrona and actress Mina El Hammani commenting on how it gives a perception of someone being good if people like who they are on the Internet, which can be dangerous.

On 29 August 2019, it was reported that the series was renewed for a third season, before the second season had aired. The third season's logo has been stylized as "ELIT3". The third season premiered on 13 March 2020.

On 20 January 2020, it was announced that the series had been renewed for a fourth and fifth season.

On 22 May 2020, Netflix officially announced the show's renewal for the fourth season, which was already in development. The fifth season was confirmed on 25 February 2021, before the release of the fourth season. The fourth season premiered on 18 June 2021.

On 28 October 2021, Netflix officially announced the renewal for the sixth season of the show.

On 24 October 2022, it was announced that Netflix renewed the series for a seventh season, with a returning cast member from season 1-5 coming back.

Casting 

Variety writes that the show's characters all "border stereotypes" but "escape total buttonholing"; director Silvia Quer said she was attracted to the show because of the well-constructed characters. The production was involved in casting for the show.

The initial main cast was confirmed before the series debut, featuring several actors from other Netflix series and films either created or distributed by Netflix España y Latinoamerica, including Itzan Escamilla of Cable Girls, Danna Paola of Lo más sencillo es complicarlo todo, and María Pedraza, Jaime Lorente, and Miguel Herrán of Money Heist. However, acting newcomer Omar Ayuso was also cast as a character (Omar Shanaa) bearing his own given name. For season two, another actress from a Netflix series, Georgina Amorós of the Catalan Welcome to the Family, was added to the cast. Announced shortly before its release, she was joined by Claudia Salas and Jorge López. Two new members of the cast for season 3, and their characters, were introduced in a short Netflix video shared by actress Ester Expósito, on 4 October 2019. They are also actors from other Netflix series: Leïti Sène of Welcome to the Family and Sergio Momo of The Neighbor.

Paola has said in interviews that she almost lost the chance to audition for the show, as the message was sent over email but landed in her spam messages folder. However, she retrieved it and sent in a video audition; the sides for this involved an early scene where her character (Lu) is having a tense conversation with the character Nadia. In the scene, Paola says that she ad-libbed using the sarcastic term of endearment "darling" ("querida" in Spanish), which the creators liked and has since become a catchphrase on the series. On 28 January 2020, it was announced that the series would consist of a new main cast for the fourth season. On 19 May 2020, it was confirmed via Élite's Instagram account that Mina El Hammani, Danna Paola, Ester Expósito, Álvaro Rico, and Jorge López will not return for season 4. Sergio Momo and Leiti Sène, who appeared in a main role in season 3, also will not return for season 4. On 22 May 2020, Itzan Escamilla, Miguel Bernardeau, Arón Piper, Omar Ayuso, Claudia Salas and Georgina Amorós were confirmed to reprise their roles in season 4. On 19 July 2020, Carla Díaz, Manu Ríos, Martina Cariddi, Pol Granch, Diego Martín and Andrés Velencoso were announced to have joined the fourth season's new main cast. On 23 and 28 December 2020, Ester Expósito and Danna Paola have been reported to return for season 5. However, during an interview at El Hormiguero, Paola stated that she left the series to focus entirely on her music career and that there is no possibility for her to return as Lu. Expósito also confirmed that she would not be returning as well, but instead that she would briefly reprise her role in the short stories. On 25 February 2021, along with the fifth season's renewal, Argentine actress Valentina Zenere and Brazilian actor André Lamoglia were officially confirmed to have joined the cast, which was initially rumours of the fans. On 25 March 2021, French actor Adam Nourou announced, via his Instagram account, that he would be joining the main cast of the fifth season. During the shooting of season 5, it was confirmed that Itzan Escamilla, Omar Ayuso, Claudia Salas, Georgina Amorós, Carla Díaz, Martina Cariddi, Manu Rìos and Pol Granch would come back in season 5. However, Miguel Bernardeau and Aron Piper won't appear in season 5, making Escamilla and Ayuso the only original actors in the series since the first season. On 20 August 2021, it was confirmed that Isabela Garrido, who had previously starred in The Mess You Leave Behind, had joined season 5 on a recurring role.

In December 2021, FormulaTV reported Carmen Arrufat to be an addition to 6th season's cast. In October 2022, Maribel Verdú was included in the cast for the seventh season.

In February 2023, Leonardo Sbaraglia was included in the cast for the seventh season.

Filming 
The series is filmed in the Madrid region, including parts filmed in San Lorenzo de El Escorial. The mountains to the north of the Spanish capital often feature in the background.

The first two seasons were shot entirely in 4K. In a tweet shared by Expósito in October 2019, the actress revealed that the third season had already completed filming.

The fourth season started filming on 3 August 2020 but suspended a day after. Filming resumed a week after when they reported that the test was fake. It was also revealed that the fifth season is being shot back-to-back with the fourth season. By 22 December 2020, filming for the season had already wrapped.

Filming for the fifth season began in February 2021 and concluded on 15 June in the same year.

Filming for the sixth season began in February 2022 and concluded on 3 June in the same year.

Filming for the seventh season began in November 2022.

Music 
Lynn Fainchtein serves as the music supervisor of the series.

Episodes

Elite: Short Stories
In May 2021, Netflix announced #EliteWeek, a week-long special of short episodes that act as a prelude to the fourth season titled Elite: Short Stories. The stories are set to "expand the Elite universe." They are not a spin-off show, but more like vignettes to bridge content that lead up to the fourth season; there are four stories, each consisting of three short episodes. The stories take place during the summer before the start of the new year in Las Encinas. In the four stories, different plots of some of the most veteran students of Las Encinas and newer ones will be explored, revealing what they have been up to in the last summer before starting their new school year. The stories are set between the events of the third and the fourth season.

In October 2021, Netflix announced three new stories, set during the holiday season, will be released in December of that year. These three episodes are set between the events of the fourth and the fifth season.

International Adaptations

Class
On 24 September 2022, during the fourth TUDUM Fan Event, Netflix announced an official Indian adaptation of Elite titled Class.

The story is based in New Delhi’s upscale school, Hampton International, where three new students from starkly different backgrounds challenge the existing dynamics at the elite enclave and their lives are immeasurably changed by the events that occur there. The Indian adaptation of the show follows the same premise as Elite, but the screenplay has incorporated many changes to keep in mind an Indian audience. Produced by Bodhitree Multimedia Limited, and directed by Ashim Ahluwalia, Class will star Gurfateh Pirzada, Ayesha Kanga, Chayan Chopra, Anjali Sivaraman, Chintan Rach, Madhyama Segal, Cyaawal Singh, Naina Bhan, Moses Koul, Piyush Khati and Zeyn Shaw.

Netflix released Class on the 3rd of February 2023.

Reception

Critical response

The first season of Elite was met with critical acclaim. On the review aggregator website Rotten Tomatoes, the first season has a 100% approval rating, based on reviews from 14 critics, with an average rating of 8.40/10. The website's critical consensus reads, "Elite is highly digestible, technically strong trash TV for anyone with a guilty pleasure palate." Other reviewers also refer to the show as a guilty pleasure. Natalie Winkelman from The Daily Beast gave the first season a positive review, saying that "with Euro-cool style and compelling characters, Elite is trashy, diverting fun." John Doyle from The Globe and Mail likewise complimented the first season in his review, adding that "Elite is no masterpiece but is one of those oddly satisfying, binge-worthy curiosities." Taylor Antrim of Vogue also said that is worth a binge-watch and "goes down like a cold glass of verdejo". Antrim wrote that the series is an example of Netflix "airing global TV shows that slavishly borrow television tropes", saying that "If it were a CW show I'd hardly give it a second look. But a Spanish prep school is seductive terra incognita" in the positive review.

Writing for Variety, Caroline Framke also comments on the series' use of tropes. She notes that being introduced to the show as a combination of many other teen dramas, she was concerned that taking on so many tropes would make it "an overstuffed Frankenstein of a show", but that she was quickly proven wrong when watching it.

Framke compares many of the characters' individual plots to other high school series and films. Of these, she finds the "love triangle between Marina, Samuel, and his brother Nano [to be] one of the show's only duller features". She concludes by saying that "Even given a million other options on Netflix alone, this tantalizing and whipsmart entry to the teen show pantheon proves itself worthy of the spotlight". David Griffin of IGN also identifies the series in the same way. He gave the first season an 8.8/10, highlighting that it sets a "new standard for how a high school drama series should be done" and "may be the best high school drama on TV."

In a similar take, Lena Finkel of Femestella looked at how the series was different to many of its counterparts by how it tackled contentious issues. Finkel lists explicitly examples, including that when Elite has sex scenes, they are often about the woman's pleasure; that a character who believes abortion is murder is still pro-choice; that when a male character is come onto by a drunk girl that he likes, he sends her home; that it explores social and class differences when young people come out; that the gay male sex scene is sensual as well as explicit; and that it features characters including a young man unashamedly nervous to lose his virginity and a straight, white, wealthy, woman who is HIV-positive. She writes that the series "absolutely lives up to the height", congratulating it both on including these features and for "a great job depicting each issue, no matter how complex". However, she does note that the trailers "made it seem like yet another cheesy, over-acted teen drama".

Also looking at how the series addresses diverse issues and modern society, Grazia Middle East wrote about the representation of Nadia. Writer Olivia Adams says that the show explores some of the more everyday struggles of racial discrimination towards Muslims by having Nadia be forced to remove her headscarf in school, something that has been considered at some real schools in Europe. She also notes how the home life of the Muslim family is explored, not just the teenagers' interrelations, giving a fuller view.

Genevieve van Voorhis of Bustle notes that the series can feel aesthetically more like a horror than a teen drama as it pairs "wide shots of the school [that] are almost Wes Anderson-like in their color coordination and perfect 90 degree angles" with eerie music.

Kathryn VanArendonk of Vulture stated in a positive review of the series that though "Elite is not pushing new boundaries in television, it's not a self-serious reboot of an old property" and that "in spite of that — or more likely because of it! — its commitment to breakneck melodrama is undeniably enjoyable." Kemi Alemoru of Dazed recommends watching the show because it is "extra", relishing in showing the excessive world of the elite students with extravagant parties and the means to escalate small fights to high-expense drama, and also for its positive representation of topics. Kayla Kumari Upadhyaya from Thrillist recommended the first season in their review of the series by stating that "Elite might be the only show that could give Riverdale a run for its money when it comes to excessive slow-motion shots." Deciders Joel Keller also compares the show to Riverdale, saying that it is "trashy and scandalous, but no moreso than anything you might see coming from American producers" and the latest of the "dark high school dramas" that became popular; Keller recommends to stream it.

On Rotten Tomatoes, the second season has an approval rating of 92% based on reviews from 12 reviews, with an average rating of 6.00/10. The website's critical consensus reads, "Elite is back for another entertaining, edge-of-your-seat mystery that succeeds thanks to charismatic characters and a bloody plot that doesn't take itself too seriously."

Framke also notes that Netflix in the United States automatically defaults to the show with an English dub, and suggests changing the audio back to its original European Spanish for the best experience.

On Rotten Tomatoes, the third season has an approval rating of 100% based on reviews from 10 critics, with an average rating of 7.40/10.
 
On Rotten Tomatoes, the fourth season has three critic reviews.The three reviews are all "Fresh".

On Rotten Tomatoes, the fifth season has an overall rating of 80% based on reviews from 5 critics, with an average rating of 5.60/10.

On Rotten Tomatoes, the sixth season has three critic reviews. The three reviews are "Rotten".

Popular response 
On 17 January 2019, Netflix announced that the series (the first season) had been streamed by over 20 million accounts within its first month of release. The series is the second most followed Spanish-language TV show on TV Time'''s top 50 most followed shows ever, ranking at number 25 globally.

After Netflix posted an image of gay characters Omar and Ander to Instagram, it received homophobic comments. The streaming service responded to one with rainbow emojis.

Accolades

|-
| rowspan="2"| 2019
| Feroz Awards
| Best Drama Series
| rowspan="4"| Elite''
| 
| style="text-align:center;"| 
|-
| GLAAD Media Awards
| rowspan="3"| Outstanding Scripted Television Series (Spanish-Language)
| 
| style="text-align:center;"| 
|-
| 2020
| GLAAD Media Awards
| 
| style="text-align:center;"| 
|-
| rowspan = "2" | 2021
| GLAAD Media Awards
| 
| style="text-align:center;"| 
|-
| 71st Fotogramas de Plata
| Best Television Actor
| Arón Piper
| 
| 
|-
| 2022
| Contigo! Awards
| Best Actor – Series
| André Lamoglia
| 
|
|-
|}

Notes

References

External links
 
 
 Elite on Metacritic
 Elite on Rotten Tomatoes

2010s crime drama television series
2010s high school television series
2010s LGBT-related drama television series
2010s teen drama television series
2018 Spanish television series debuts
Crime thriller television series
Gay-related television shows
HIV/AIDS in television
Male bisexuality in fiction
Mass media portrayals of the upper class
Murder in television
Nonlinear narrative television series
Spanish crime television series
Spanish LGBT-related television shows
Spanish-language Netflix original programming
Teenage pregnancy in television
Television series about teenagers
Television shows filmed in Spain
Television series about bullying
2010s Spanish drama television series
2020s Spanish drama television series
2020s teen drama television series
Spanish teen drama television series
Television series by Zeta Studios
2020s LGBT-related drama television series